is the highest of the Three Mountains of Dewa in the ancient province of Dewa (modern-day Yamagata prefecture).

It has a long hike from its trailhead and usually requires about 4-5 hours to hike it.  Visitors should be aware of the weather and not try to hike it during windy or days with heavy rain.  Also note that the trail is not paved and in some parts requires use of hands to clear certain parts of the trail. 

Due to heavy winter snowfall, the mountain and shrine are inaccessible for long periods of the year; however, skiing is possible on the mountain from April to mid-summer.

The mountain is interesting in that it contains elements of both shield volcanoes as well as stratovolcanoes, although it is classified as a stratovolcano.

Gallery

See also
 List of volcanoes in Japan
 List of mountains in Japan

References

External links

 
 Mount Gassan Travel: (Japanese)
 Mt. Gassan Page: (English)
 Mount Gassan Travel: (English)

Gassan
Shinto shrines in Yamagata Prefecture
Gassan
Stratovolcanoes of Japan
Pleistocene stratovolcanoes